Louise Lombard (born Louise Marie Perkins; 13 September 1970) is an English actress. She is known for her roles as Evangeline Eliott in the BBC drama series The House of Eliott (1991–94) and Sofia Curtis in the CBS drama series CSI: Crime Scene Investigation (2004–11).

Early life and education
Lombard was born in Redbridge, London, England, the fifth of seven children. One of her siblings is former footballer Declan Perkins.

Lombard began taking drama lessons when she was eight. She attended Trinity Catholic High School, a Roman Catholic school, from which she achieved nine O Levels. Lombard studied English literature at Cambridge University.

Career
Lombard is best known for playing Evangeline Eliott in the 1990s television drama The House of Eliott. Her first big break was in the hit series Chancer, after which Lombard went on to star in the television dramas Bodyguards and Metropolis and several films including Gold in the Streets, My Kingdom and After the Rain.

In 1994, she was named one of People Magazines 50 Most Beautiful People in the World. From 1998 to 2000, Lombard took a career break to study English literature at Cambridge.

In 1998, Lombard starred in Tale of the Mummy; and, in 1999, she starred in the film Esther, with F. Murray Abraham. In 1999 Lombard starred in After the Rain with Ariyon Bakare, Paul Bettany and Peter Krummack.

In 2004, Lombard appeared in the film Hidalgo. In November that same year, Lombard began a recurring role on the television series CSI: Crime Scene Investigation during Seasons 5 and 6. She made her first appearance in Season 5, Episode 7 ("Formalities"), playing Sofia Curtis, a crime scene investigator who later becomes a homicide detective. In September 2006, in the Season 7 premiere ("Built to Kill, Part 1"), Lombard began a regular role which she held throughout that season, until its finale ("Living Doll"). In September 2007, Lombard appeared in the Season 8 premiere ("Dead Doll") and was credited as a Special Guest Star.

In 2009, Lombard appeared in the backdoor pilot episode of NCIS: Los Angeles, which aired during Season 6 of the main NCIS series; Episodes 22 ("Legend Part 1") and 23 ("Legend Part 2"). She played Special Agent Lara Macy in charge of the NCIS Office of Special Projects in Los Angeles.   

In March 2011, TVLine announced that Lombard would reprise her role as Sofia Curtis on CSI: Crime Scene Investigation in the Season 11 episode "Father of the Bride", which aired on 28 April 2011 and revealed that her character had been promoted to Deputy Chief.

In 2014, Lombard starred in the pilot for the Lifetime post-apocalyptic drama series The Lottery.

Filmography

References

External links 
 

1970 births
Living people
Actresses from Essex
People from the London Borough of Redbridge
Alumni of St Edmund's College, Cambridge
English film actresses
English television actresses
English people of Irish descent
English expatriates in the United States
20th-century English actresses
21st-century English actresses
Actresses from London